Yehuda Meir Shapiro (March 3, 1887 – October 27, 1933), was a prominent Polish Hasidic rabbi and rosh yeshiva, also known as the Lubliner Rav. He is noted for his promotion of the Daf Yomi study program in 1923, and establishing the Chachmei Lublin Yeshiva in 1930.

During the years 1922 to 1927 Shapiro was the first Orthodox Jew to become a member in the Sejm (Parliament) of the Second Polish Republic representing the Jewish minority of the country.

Biography

Early years

Yehuda Meir Shapiro was born on the 7th day of Adar (in Jewish tradition, also the birth date of Moses) in the city of Shatz, Bucovina, then in the Austrian-Hungarian Empire, now in Romania, in 1887. He was a descendant of Rabbi Pinchas Shapiro of Korets, one of the students of the Baal Shem Tov, and from his maternal side, of Rabbi Joseph ben Isaac Bekhor Shor, a French tosafist. After cheder, Shapiro began to study with his grandfather, the Baal Minchas Shai (Rabbi . Another of his early teachers was Rabbi Shulem Moshkovitz (popularly known as the Shotzer Rebbe. He was also a well known kabbalist).

In 1906 he "married the daughter of Reb Ya'akov Breitman, a wealthy landowner of Tarnopol, Galicia." Shapiro began to get a reputation, and became known as the Illui of Shatz. From an early age, he was known as an outstanding leader and gifted speaker. He was soon ordained by many great scholars, including the Maharsham. His grandfather introduced him to the Chortkover Rebbe, and thus began his passion for Hasidism, and the beginning of his relationship with the Chortkover Rebbe.

Galina
His first rabbinical posting came in 1911 when he was appointed Rav of Galina. He spent ten years in the city, during which time he established a yeshiva called Bnei Torah. Construction commenced in 1920. The yeshiva held a Talmud Torah, a place to train rabbis, and a kitchen to feed orphaned children. It ran at a budget of over half a million marks. This yeshiva served as a prototype for what was later to become Chachmei Lublin.

Sanok
After leaving Galina, Shapiro began serving as Rav of Sanok in 1920.

Petrakov
In 1924, Shapiro accepted his third rabbinical position in Petrakov/Piotrkow.

Lublin
On 14 June 1931, he was appointed rabbi of Lublin in the old synagogue of the Maharshal.

Daf Yomi

Shapiro introduced the revolutionary idea of Daf Yomi ("page [of the] day" or "daily folio"), a daily regimen undertaken to study the Babylonian Talmud one folio (a daf consists of both sides of the page) each day. Under this regimen, the entire Talmud is completed, one day at a time, in a cycle of seven and a half years. Rabbi Shapiro introduced his idea at the First World Congress of the World Agudath Israel in Vienna on 16 August 1923. The first cycle of Daf Yomi commenced on the first day of Rosh Hashanah 5684 (11 September 1923). Now in its 14th cycle, Daf Yomi has been taken up by tens of thousands of Jews worldwide.

Yeshivas Chachmei Lublin

Yeshivas Chachmei Lublin was, along with Daf Yomi, Shapiro's greatest achievement. He conceived of a yeshiva for Hasidic Poland, modeled on Lithuanian yeshivas such as Volozhin, Slabodka and Novardok, but which would train Hasidic rabbis as the next generation to lead Polish Jewry. The Yeshiva was housed in a massive building, housed hundreds of students, and had a vast library of over 100,000 books.

On May 22–28, 1924, the cornerstone laying ceremony took place for the construction of the yeshiva building. Approximately 20,000 people participated in the event. The opening ceremony took place on June 24–25, 1930. Apart from thousands of local Jews, around 10,000 people arrived from all over Poland and abroad.
Shapiro served as rosh yeshiva until his death.

Łódź
In 1932 Shapiro was approached by leaders of the Jewish Community of Łódź, who wanted to offer him the position of Chief Rabbi of Łódź. Many people wanted to appoint Rabbi Mendel Alter of Kalish, (b. 1877, Ger) the brother to the Gerrer Rebbe (and youngest son of the Sfas Emes) to this position. Rabbi Shapiro negotiated that a large part of his wage would go to pay off the debts that Chachmei Lublin was still struggling to pay off. Eventually it was decided to give it to Rabbi Shapiro. After all the protracted negotiation that went on to get Rabbi Shapiro into this position, he died three days after being appointed Chief Rabbi.

Political activities

Agudat Yisrael
Whilst serving in Galina, Rabbi Shapiro began his involvement with Agudat Israel. He was present at its founding conference in 1912. In 1914 he was appointed head of the Education Department of Agudas Yisrael in East Galicia, becoming president in 1922 of Agudas Yisrael in Poland. He played a role in the conference in the city of Lvov, which had the purpose of launching the Aguda in Galicia, some two years after its founding in Katovitz in 5672 (c. 1911).

At the time, he was also added as a member to the Moetzes Gedolei HaTorah. Rabbi Shapiro was initially very doubtful as to whether he should become an MP for the party, but was encouraged to do so by his rebbe, the Chortkover.

Rabbi Shapiro, together with Aron Levine and Zalman Sorotzkin, chaired the committee which as a part of the Polish Ministry for Religious Affairs, held responsibility for delegating Rabbinical positions throughout Poland. He was also part of the Vaad HaChinuch.

Beginning in 1922, Rabbi Shapiro served as a parliamentarian to the Polish Sejm. In 1928 he stepped down as a politician so that he could devote all his energies to Chachmei Lublin Yeshiva.

Death
Shapiro became ill with typhus in 1933 and died within the month, on 27 October 1933 (7 Cheshvan 5694) at the age of 46. His death was mourned in both Jewish and non-Jewish Poland. Countless newspapers across the entire political spectrum, from Orthodox to Yiddishist to socialist, featured front-page biographies of Rabbi Shapiro.

Shapiro's remains were reinterred in Israel in 1958, under the auspices of his brother. He was reburied in Har HaMenuchot with a full ceremony. Rabbi Yitzchok Meir Levin delivered a eulogy, as did those students of his who had survived the Holocaust.

Legacy
Shapiro is widely revered throughout the Jewish world as the founder of Daf Yomi. The neighborhood of Zikhron Meir in Bnei Brak was established in his memory by Yaakov Halperin; this is the neighborhood that hosts many of the major yeshivas in Bnei Brak.

Shlomo Artzi, a famous Israeli musical artist, is Shapiro's grand-nephew.
Famous students of Rav Shapiro who continued his legacy, include rabbi Pinchas Hirschprung  and rabbi Shmuel halevi Wosner .

Works
Shapiro was considered a gaon (Torah genius) in his lifetime. He studied Torah extensively and was a great scholar even by the high standards of the era he lived in. His two major works are Ohr HaMeir and Imrei Da'as.

Ohr HaMeir - It was in Petrakov that he printed his book of responsa entitled Ohr HaMeir in 1926. As a work it operates on many different subjects, from philosophy to halacha.
Imrei Daas - a compilation of Torah thoughts on Halacha and Aggada, which was lost during World War II. The book contained an approbation from Rabbi Meir Arik of Meturnah.
Vortelach - Shapiro was a quick and brilliant thinker, and his numerous vortelach (short responsa) have been collected in numerous volumes, and quoted in many books.

See also
 History of Jews in Poland

References

External links
 Biography of Meir Shapiro by Feldheim Publishers 
 Audio biography of Rabbi Meir Shapiro
 Only with Joy - A documentary about the life of Rabbi Meir Shapiro produced by Menachem Daum and David Lenik

1887 births
1923 in Judaism
1933 deaths
20th-century Polish rabbis
Hasidic rosh yeshivas
Polish Hasidic rabbis
Bukovina Jews
Austro-Hungarian Jews
Romanian Jews
Polish people of Romanian descent
People from Suceava
Infectious disease deaths in Poland
Deaths from typhus
Burials at Har HaMenuchot